The 1st Mounted Division was a cavalry division that served as part of the Egyptian Expeditionary Force in Palestine in World War I.  It was formed in April 1918 when the Yeomanry Mounted Division was merged with elements of the 1st Indian Cavalry Division withdrawn from the Western Front. In July 1918, the combined division was renamed as the 4th Cavalry Division. It remained in Palestine after the end of the war on occupation duties until finally broken up in 1921.

History

1st Mounted Division
In March 1918, the 1st Indian Cavalry Division was broken up in France.  The British units (notably 6th (Inniskilling) Dragoons, 17th Lancers, 1/1st Queen's Own Yorkshire Dragoons and A, Q and U Batteries RHA) remained in France and the Indian elements were sent to Egypt.

By an Egyptian Expeditionary Force GHQ Order of 12 April 1918, the mounted troops of the EEF were reorganised when the Indian Army units arrived in theatre.  On 24 April 1918, the Yeomanry Mounted Division was indianized and its title was changed to 1st Mounted Division, the third distinct division to bear this title.

On 24 April 1918, the 6th Mounted Brigade was merged with elements of the 5th (Mhow) Cavalry Brigade, the 8th Mounted Brigade with the 8th (Lucknow) Cavalry Brigade, and the 22nd Mounted Brigade with the 2nd (Sialkot) Cavalry Brigade.  Six of the Yeomanry Regiments were merged in pairs, converted to Machine Gun Battalions, and posted to the Western Front:
C Battalion, Machine Gun Corps was formed by the merger of the 1/1st Royal Buckinghamshire Hussars and the 1/1st Berkshire Yeomanry
D Battalion, Machine Gun Corps was formed by the merger of the 1/1st Lincolnshire Yeomanry and the 1/1st East Riding of Yorkshire Yeomanry 
E Battalion, Machine Gun Corps was formed by the merger of the 1/1st City of London Yeomanry (Rough Riders) and the 1/3rd County of London Yeomanry (Sharpshooters) 
They were replaced by Indian Cavalry Regiments from France.  The Field Ambulances and Mobile Veterinary Sections merged with their Indian counterparts.  Other units were retained unchanged, though some were renumbered to reflect the new divisional designation.

4th Cavalry Division
On 22 July 1918, the 1st Mounted Division was renumbered as the 4th Cavalry Division and the brigades as the 10th, 11th and 12th Cavalry Brigades.  The sub units (Signal Troops, Combined Cavalry Field Ambulances and Mobile Veterinary Sections) were renumbered on the same date.

Battles
The 1st Mounted / 4th Cavalry Division served with the Desert Mounted Corps for the rest of the war, taking part in the Second Transjordan Raid (30 April to 4 May 1918) and the Final Offensive, in particular the Battle of Megiddo (19 to 25 September) and the Capture of Damascus (1 October).

After the Armistice of Mudros, the division remained in Palestine on occupation duties after the end of the war.  However, demobilization began immediately and most of the British war time units had left by May 1919, though the 1/1st County of London Yeomanry did not leave until March 1920.  The division was finally broken up in 1921.

See also

 5th Cavalry Division (British Indian Army) formed at the same time in a similar manner.
 List of Indian divisions in World War I

Notes

References

Bibliography
 
 

British Indian Army divisions
Indian World War I divisions
Military units and formations established in 1918
Military units and formations disestablished in 1921
British cavalry divisions